2012 OFC Women's Under 20 Qualifying Tournament was the 5th edition of OFC Women's Under 20 Qualifying Tournament. The tournament took place in Auckland, New Zealand from 10 to 14 April.  It was initially scheduled to be played in Auckland, New Zealand from 16–20 January 2012, but was postponed by Oceania Football Confederation due to two late entries. The Championship acted as the continent's qualifying event for the 2012 FIFA U-20 Women's World Cup that will take place Japan later in this year.

The tournament was won by New Zealand, who qualified to the World Cup.

The tournament was held alongside the 2012 OFC Women's Under 17 Qualifying Tournament, using the same venue and alternating matchdays.

Participating teams
 (hosts)

Format
The four teams played a round-robin. The winner advanced to the World Cup.

Matches

Top goalscorers
players with at least two goals
8 goals
  Rosie White

4 goals
  Marie Heutro

3 goals
  Kim Maguire
  Olivia Chance
  Kate Loye
  Katie Rood
  Hannah Wilkinson
  Sandra Birum

2 goals
  Georgia Brown
  Stephanie Skilton

Awards
New Zealand's White was handed the golden boot for scoring eight goals. New Zealand’s Erin Naylor received the golden gloves as best goalkeeper of the tournament. The golden ball for best player was handed to New Zealand's Kate Loye . New Caledonia received the Fair Play Award.

References

External links
Official website
Championship at futbol24.com

2012
OFC
2012
Under
OFC
2012 in youth association football